Anthony Nicholls may refer to:

 Anthony Nicholls (actor) (1902–1977), English film, television, and stage actor
 Anthony Nicholls (physicist), CEO and President of OpenEye Scientific Software

See also
Anthony Nicholl or Nichols
Tony Nichols, bishop